The term express lanes may refer to the following different types of roadways:

 High-occupancy toll lane (including Express toll lanes)
 Local–express lanes
 Reversible lane